Macroglossum poecilum is a moth of the family Sphingidae. It is known from Hong Kong, Taiwan, southern Japan (Ryukyu Archipelago) and Malaysian northern Borneo (Sarawak).

Larvae have been recorded feeding on Lasianthus chinensis in Hong Kong.

References

Macroglossum
Moths described in 1903
Moths of Japan